John Giannandrea is a Scottish software engineer and businessman. He co-founded Metaweb, led Google Search and artificial intelligence, was co-founder and CTO of the speech recognition company Tellme Networks, Chief Technologist of the web browser group at Netscape, senior engineer at General Magic, and is now a senior executive at Apple Inc. In December 2018, it was announced that Giannandrea had been appointed Senior Vice President of Machine Learning and Artificial Intelligence Strategy at Apple, the department rumored to have the most involvement with Apple’s electric car project.

References

Year of birth missing (living people)
Living people
Computer programmers
Google employees
Apple Inc. employees
Apple Inc. executives
Scottish expatriates in the United States
Scottish people of Italian descent